An integrated product team (IPT) is a multidisciplinary group of people who are collectively responsible for delivering a defined product or process.

IPTs are used in complex development programs/projects for review and decision making.  The emphasis of the IPT is on involvement of all stakeholders (users, customers, management, developers, contractors) in a collaborative forum.  IPTs may be addressed at the program level, but there may also be Oversight IPTs (OIPTs), or Working-level IPTs (WIPTs).
IPTs are created most often as part of structured systems engineering methodologies, focusing attention on understanding the needs and desires of each stakeholder.

IPTs were introduced to the U.S. DoD in 1995 as part of the major acquisition reforms to the way goods and services were acquired.

References

External links
Integrated Product Teams (IPT) DAU Acquisition library entry on IPTs. 
Integrated Product Team (IPT) AcqNotes article on IPT
Mitre Integrated Project Team Start-up Guide, October 2008
Rules of the Road A Guide for Leading Successful Integrated Product Teams, 1999

Systems engineering